Dordrechts Museum is an art museum in Dordrecht, Netherlands. The museum was founded in 1842 and has a collection of artists of the last 400 years.

Paintings
The museum has works of the following artists:

Gallery

References

External links

 
Dordrechts Museum, English information

Art museums and galleries in the Netherlands
Art museums established in 1842
1842 establishments in the Netherlands
Museums in South Holland
Buildings and structures in Dordrecht
Museums in Dordrecht
19th-century architecture in the Netherlands